S100 or S-100 may refer to:
 S-100 bus, an early computer bus
 S-100, an International Hydrographic Organization standard 
 S100 protein, low-molecular-weight proteins in vertebrates 
 The road number used in the Netherlands for inner-city ring roads
 AVE Class 100, or S100, a high speed train 
 Canon PowerShot S100, a camera
 Colyaer Freedom S100, a Spanish amphibious ultralight aircraft
 Colyaer Gannet S100, a Spanish ultralight flying boat
 Colyaer Martin3 S100 is a Spanish ultralight aircraft
 A class of WWII German E-Boat.
 Guild S-100, an electric guitar
 Lenovo IdeaPad S100, a netbook computer
 Qtek S100, a mobile phone
 Schiebel Camcopter S-100, an unmanned aerial vehicle
 Škoda 100, a 1970s car
 USATC S100 Class, a 1942 steam locomotive class

See also